The East Syracuse Minoa Central School District (ESM) is a pre-K through 12th grade public school district with its headquarters in Manlius, New York, enrolling approximately 3,500 students. ESM serves portions of the towns of DeWitt and Manlius, specifically the villages of East Syracuse, Minoa, and Kirkville as well as portions of Eastwood, Fayetteville, and Bridgeport. The district is partially funded by and governed under the authority of the New York State Education Department, whose standardized examinations are designed and administered by the Board of Regents of the University of the State of New York.

Demographics
As of the Fall of 2018, there were approximately 3,500 students enrolled in the East Syracuse Minoa Central School District. As of the fall of 2010, The racial/ethnic makeup of the student population was 92.2% White, 3.2% Black or African American, 1.4% Asian or Pacific Islander, 1.4% Hispanic, and 1.8% Native American. Approximately 1.8% of the population, or 64 students, demonstrated limited English proficiency. About 6.6% of the student body qualified for a reduced lunch price, and 12.9% were eligible for a free lunch.

There were 323 teachers and 653 total staff employed in the school district, with a student to teacher ratio of approximately 11:1, though it is noted that the average ratio in eighth grade, and tenth grade core classes ranged only 19-20 students per teacher.

Schools

High School (Grades 9-12)
East Syracuse-Minoa Central High School,Mr. Grenardo L. Avellino, Executive Principal6400 Fremont RoadEast Syracuse, NY 13057.

Middle School (Grades 6-8)
Pine Grove Middle School, Mrs.Wilson, Principal101 Spartan WayEast Syracuse, NY 13057

Elementary Schools (Grades K-5)
East Syracuse Elementary School, Mr. Ronald Perry, Principal230 Kinne StreetEast Syracuse, NY 13057
Fremont Elementary School, Mrs. Kelsey DeLany, Principal115 Richmond Road WestEast Syracuse, NY 13057
Minoa Elementary School, Mr. Gary Gerst, Principal501 N. Main StreetMinoa, NY 13116
Woodland Elementary School, Mrs. Gina Terzini, Principal100 Spartan WayEast Syracuse, NY 13057

Specialty Schools
Park Hill Pre-Kindergarten,  Mrs. Pam Buddendeck, Principal303 Roby AvenueEast Syracuse, NY 13057

Administration
Dr. Donna J. DeSiato is the current Superintendent of Schools.

See also

List of high schools in New York
List of school districts in New York

References

External links
 NYS Education Department 2006 Report Card
District Links
East Syracuse Minoa Central School District Homepage
ESM Alumni
East Syracuse Minoa Spartan Marching Band
Athletic Links
ESM Athletics
New York State Public High School Athletic Association Homepage

School districts in New York (state)
Education in Onondaga County, New York
DeWitt, New York
Manlius, New York